Ulyukchikan is a rural locality (an ulus) in Barguzinsky District, Republic of Buryatia, Russia. The population was 446 as of 2010. There are 7 streets.

Geography 
Ulyukchikan is located 38 km northeast of Barguzin (the district's administrative centre) by road. Ulyun is the nearest rural locality.

References 

Rural localities in Barguzinsky District